Conway is a town in Northampton County, North Carolina, United States. The population was 836 at the 2010 census. It is part of the Roanoke Rapids, North Carolina Micropolitan Statistical Area.

Geography
Conway is located at  (36.437687, -77.226782).

Demographics

2020 census

As of the 2020 United States census, there were 752 people, 306 households, and 221 families residing in the town.

2010 census
As of the 2010 United States Census, there were 836 people living in the town. The racial makeup of the town was 48.6% White, 47.7% Black and 1.3% from two or more races. 2.4% were Hispanic or Latino of any race.

2000 census
As of the census of 2000, there were 734 people, 328 households, and 205 families living in the town. The population density was 406.0 people per square mile (156.6/km2). There were 356 housing units at an average density of 196.9 per square mile (75.9/km2). The racial makeup of the town was 65.53% White, 33.24% African American, 0.54% Native American, and 0.68% from two or more races. Hispanic or Latino of any race were 0.27% of the population.

There were 328 households, out of which 27.7% had children under the age of 18 living with them, 41.8% were married couples living together, 18.0% had a female householder with no husband present, and 37.5% were non-families. 35.1% of all households were made up of individuals, and 14.9% had someone living alone who was 65 years of age or older. The average household size was 2.24 and the average family size was 2.88.

In the town, the population was spread out, with 24.5% under the age of 18, 7.2% from 18 to 24, 23.7% from 25 to 44, 25.6% from 45 to 64, and 18.9% who were 65 years of age or older. The median age was 42 years. For every 100 females, there were 75.6 males. For every 100 females age 18 and over, there were 66.9 males.

The median income for a household in the town was $23,250, and the median income for a family was $27,386. Males had a median income of $26,932 versus $21,538 for females. The per capita income for the town was $14,969. About 24.9% of families and 24.1% of the population were below the poverty line, including 36.3% of those under age 18 and 21.1% of those age 65 or over.

Notable people
 Stu Flythe, former Major League Baseball player
 Fred Vinson, NBA player

References

Towns in Northampton County, North Carolina
Towns in North Carolina
Roanoke Rapids, North Carolina micropolitan area